717 Wisibada (prov. designation:  or ) is a dark background asteroid from the outer regions of the asteroid belt. It was discovered on 26 August 1911, by German astronomer Franz Kaiser at the Heidelberg-Königstuhl State Observatory in southwest Germany. It was named after the discoverer's birthplace, the city of Wiesbaden in Hesse, Germany.

Orbit and classification 

Wisibada is a non-family asteroid of the main belt's background population when applying the hierarchical clustering method to its proper orbital elements. It orbits the Sun in the outer asteroid belt at a distance of 2.3–4.0 AU once every 5 years and 7 months (2,031 days; semi-major axis of 3.14 AU). Its orbit has an eccentricity of 0.26 and an inclination of 2° with respect to the ecliptic. The body's observation arc begins at Vienna Observatory on 22 August 1922, or one year after its official discovery observation at the Heidelberg Observatory.

Naming 

This minor planet was named by the discoverer Franz Kaiser after his birthplace, the city of Wiesbaden in Hesse, Germany. Kaiser also named asteroid 765 Mattiaca after Wiesbaden using the city's Latin name, Aquae Mattiacorum, which means "Waters of the Mattiaci". The  was mentioned in The Names of the Minor Planets by Paul Herget in 1955.

Physical characteristics 

In the Tholen classification, Wisibadas spectral type is closest to a dark D-type asteroid, and somewhat similar to an X-type asteroid, though with a noisy spectrum (DX:).

Rotation period 

As of 2020, no rotational lightcurve of Wisibada has been obtained from photometric observations. The body's rotation period, pole and shape remain unknown.

Diameter and albedo 

The Collaborative Asteroid Lightcurve Link derives an albedo of 0.0796 and a diameter of 31.12 kilometers based on an absolute magnitude of 10.9.

References

External links 
 Lightcurve Database Query (LCDB), at www.minorplanet.info
 Dictionary of Minor Planet Names, Google books
 Discovery Circumstances: Numbered Minor Planets (1)-(5000) – Minor Planet Center
 
 

000717
Discoveries by Franz Kaiser
Named minor planets
000717
19110826